Meet is an early Australian television series which aired on ABC during 1957. The series consisted of interviews in a 15-minute time-slot, with a single person interviewed in each episode. It aired live in Melbourne, with telerecordings (also known as kinescope recordings) made of the broadcasts so it could be shown in Sydney. In Melbourne it aired on Mondays. Following the end of the series, it was followed up with an interview series titled People.

Those who were interviewed in the series included Anona Winn, Hal Gye, Samuel Wadhams, Alan Marshall, Ian Clunies-Ross, Myra Roper, John Bechervaise, among others.

A search of the National Archives of Australia website suggests that at least two of the episodes still exist despite the wiping of the era. These episodes are the interviews with Ian Clunies-Ross and Vance Palmer.

References

External links

1957 Australian television series debuts
1957 Australian television series endings
Australian non-fiction television series
Black-and-white Australian television shows
Australian live television series
Australian television talk shows
Australian Broadcasting Corporation original programming
English-language television shows